Samuel C. Herren (February 14, 1856 – February 21, 1929) was an American politician in the state of Washington. He served in the Washington House of Representatives from 1889 to 1891.

References

Republican Party members of the Washington House of Representatives
1856 births
1929 deaths